Stamp on It is the first extended play by South Korean supergroup Got the Beat. It was released by SM Entertainment on January 16, 2023, and contains six tracks, including the lead single of the same name.

Background and release
On December 23, 2022, SM Entertainment announced Got the Beat would be releasing a new song in January 2023. On December 29, it was announced they would be releasing their first extended play titled Stamp on It with lead single of the same name on January 16, 2023. On January 2, 2023, the promotional schedule was released. On January 15, the music video teaser for "Stamp on It" was released. The extended play was released alongside the music video for "Stamp on It" on January 16.

Composition
Stamp on It consists of six tracks and incorporates various genres of dance. The lead single "Stamp on It" was described as a R&B and hip-hop-based dance song characterized by "piano and bass rhythm" with lyrics about "expressing the story of reaching the top spot in a fierce stage competition". The second track "Goddess Level" was described as a "powerful" dance song characterized by "heavy trap beat and rhythmic brass sound". The third track "Alter Ego" was described as a dance song featuring "various bass riffs in the chorus" with lyrics about "the seriousness of environmental problems". The fourth track "Rose" was described as a song R&B hip-hop song featuring "vocal chop and minimal beat" with lyrics about "comparing beauty that cannot be overlooked to the sharp thorns of a rose". The fifth track "Outlaw" was described as dance song featuring "dynamic bass rhythm layered with synthesizer rhythm". The sixth track "Mala" was described as a "hybrid" pop song featuring "the sound of a flute mixed with the sound of bass rhythm".

Commercial performance
Stamp on It debuted at number three on South Korea's Circle Album Chart in the chart issue dated January 15–21, 2023; on its monthly chart, the EP debuted at number 16 in the chart issue dated January 2023. In Japan, the EP debuted at number 27 on the Oricon's Albums Chart in the chart issue dated January 30, 2023. It also debuted at number ten on the Oricon Digital Albums Chart, and number 35 on the Oricon Combined Albums chart in the chart issue dated January 30, 2023.

Track listing

Credits and personnel
Credits adapted from EP's liner notes.

Studio
 SM Booming System – recording, mixing, digital editing 
 SM Starlight Studio – recording , digital editing 
 Doobdoob Studio – recording 
 SM Yellow Tail Studio – recording , digital editing 
 SM Ssam Studio – recording , engineered for mix , digital editing 
 MonoTree Studio – recording 
 SM Big Shot Studio – recording , digital editing  
 Sound Pool Studio – recording 
 SM Blue Cup Studio – recording , mixing 
 SM Lvyin Studio – mixing , digital editing 
 SM Blue Ocean Studio – mixing 
 SM Concert Hall Studio – mixing 
 Sonic Korea – mastering 
 821 Sound Mastering – mastering

Personnel

 SM Entertainment – executive producer
 Lee Soo-man – producer
 Lee Sung-soo – production director, executive supervisor
 Tak Young-jun – executive supervisor
 Got the Beat – vocals, background vocals 
 Yoo Young-jin – background vocals , music and sound supervisor , lyrics , composition , arrangement , recording , mixing , vocal directing , digital editing  
 Kim Yeon-seo – background vocals , vocal directing 
  (Soultriii) – background vocals, composition, arrangement  
 Anne Judith Wik – background vocals , composition 
 Kriz – background vocals, vocal directing 
 Hong Da-young (Lalala Studio) – lyrics 
 Danke (Lalala Studio) – lyrics 
 Song Jae-ri (153/Joombas) – lyrics 
 Lee Hyung-seok – lyrics 
 Dem Jointz – composition, arrangement 
 Tayla Parx – composition 
 Ronny Svendsen – composition, arrangement 
 Nermin Harambašić – composition 
 Adrian Thesen – composition, arrangement 
 Steve Diamond – composition 
 Josh Cumbee – composition, arrangement 
 Jordan Powers – composition 
 Kella Armitage – composition 
 Jacob Attwooll – composition 
 Elsa Curran – composition 
 Niiva – composition 
 Yunsu (Soultriii) – composition, arrangement 
 Saay (Soultriii) – composition, background vocals 
 Kim Woong – composition, arrangement 
 Stereo14 – composition, arrangement 
 Maria Marcus – composition 
 Andreas Öberg – composition 
 Eugene Kwon – recording 
 Jung Yu-ra – recording , digital editing 
 Lee Joo-myung – recording, vocal directing, Pro Tools operator 
 Noh Min-ji – recording , digital editing 
 Kang Eun-ji – recording , digital editing , engineered for mix 
 Lee Min-gyu – recording, digital editing 
 Jung Ho-jin – recording 
 Jung Eui-seok – recording , mixing 
 Lee Ji-hong – mixing , digital editing 
 Kim Cheol-sun – mixing 
 Nam Koong-jin – mixing 
 Jeon Hoon – mastering 
 Shin Soo-min – mastering assistant 
 Kwon Nam-woo – mastering 
 In Jung-kyu – digital editing 
 Maxx Song – vocal directing, Pro Tools operator

Charts

Weekly charts

Monthly charts

Sales

Release history

References

2023 debut EPs
Korean-language EPs
SM Entertainment EPs